Louis Like His Daily Dip is an EP by the New Zealand band Tall Dwarfs, released in 1982.

Track listing
"Louis The First"
"Maybe"
"Pictures On The Floor"
"Paul's Place"
"Clover"
"Song Of The Silents"
"Louis The Second"

References

Tall Dwarfs albums
1982 EPs
Flying Nun Records EPs